Lato is a surname. Notable people with the surname include:

 Danuta Lato (born 1963), Polish model and actress
 Grzegorz Lato (born 1950), Polish footballer
 Jarosław Lato (born 1977), Polish footballer
 Lajos Látó (born 1932), Hungarian cyclist
 Piotr Lato (born 1979), Polish singer
 Stanley J. Lato (1924–2002), American politician
 Toni Lato (born 1997), Spanish footballer

See also
 

Polish-language surnames